The 12th Parliament of Kenya is the meeting of the legislative branch of the national government of Kenya, which began on 31 August 2017. The National Assembly is made up of 350 members comprising 290 members elected from constituencies, 47 women representatives, 12 nominated members. and the Speaker of the National Assembly of Kenya.

The senate is made up of 67 members, comprising 47 members elected from the counties, and 20 nominated members.

The members took office following the 2017 Kenyan general election.

See also

 List of members of the National Assembly of Kenya, 2017–2022

References

External links
 

Politics of Kenya
Kenyan parliaments
2017 in Kenya
2018 in Kenya
2019 in Kenya